Manoj George is an Indian violinist and a music composer. He performed as the conductor, string arranger, solo violinist and choral arranger of 2 albums : Winds of Samsara, which won the Grammy Award for the Best New Age Album in 2015 and Divine Tides in 2022. He is reported to be the first Indian violinist recognised by the National Academy of Recording Arts and Sciences, The Grammys, United States and the first Malayali violinist to receive the honour. Manoj George has won several accolades for his Music Compositions including a nomination to HollyWood Music in Media awards and Silver Medal from Global Music Awards.

Manoj George estimated to be performed at more than 3000 concerts around the globe. He has composed music for Malayalam and Kannada films, documentary films, corporate movies and advertisements. He is the brand ambassador for Roland - Japan, Cantini Electric violins - Italy & Stentor Violins - UK. One of the best violinists known for his own compositions and noted for introducing contemporary styles on violin amalgamating western music with Indian classical. His experiments in Indian music with different styles of music from different parts of the world like blues, Latin, Indo jazz etc brought him to be one of the famous violinists in India. He is an avid humanitarian and philanthropist, donating and raising money for beneficial causes and supporting charities.

Awards and recognitions 
. 2022 - Performed as the conductor, string arranger, solo violinist and choral arranger for the album 'Divine Tides which won the Grammy Award for the Best New Age Album.
 2020 - Manoj George had nominated for Hollywood Music in Media Awards for the world category for his composition "Sparkling Celebrations"
 2019 - Manoj George's original composition - “Saraswati”, which highlights cultural harmony by blending western and Carnatic styles has won Silver medal (Outstanding Achievement award) from Global Music awards in 2019.
 2018 - He was also the Music Director for the film Urvi which has been nominated by the Los Angeles Film Awards in 2017 and won the best feature film at New York city film awards in 2018.
 2015 - Recognised by The Grammy, where he performed as the conductor, string arranger, violinist and choral arranger for the album Winds of Samsara, which won the Grammy Award for the Best New Age Album.
 2001 - He scored the background music for a Malayalam film " Kharaaksharangal " which won the National Film Award for Best Children's Film.Recognitions Represented Kerala & Lakshadweep NCC directorate as the cultural leader at the Republic Day Camp Held in New Delhi in 1990. He was awarded a scholarship from the Ministry of Human Resource and Culture, Govt. of India, New Delhi for the years 1992–1994.
 He was honored by Oommen Chandy the Chief Minister of Kerala for his achievements in music on 25 August 2015 in Thiruvananthapuram , the capital city of Kerala.
 He is the first Indian violinist to serve as the Brand Ambassador for Roland Corporation Japan, Cantini Electric violins Italy, and Stentor Violins UK.

 Performances 
Manoj George has performed widely in India and across the World with various groups, musicians and at numerous prestigious events (>3000 performances).

Manoj George has composed “Burning Love” for Pope Francis for his 83rd birthday celebration at HongKong and Macau on 13th and 15th of Dec 2019. The music track was accompanied by a chamber orchestra from Vienna conducted by Francois-Pierre Descamps and the soprano by the famous German singer Barbara Kajetanowicz along with his solo violin. Manoj George composed this music in Raga Jog combining different styles music from different parts of the world.

His notable concerts include the performance at the Miss World pageant in 2001, opening act for Canadian rock musician, Bryan Adams and representing India at the World Military Games. He represented Kerala and Lakshadweep NCC (National Cadet Corps) (India) Directorate as the Cultural Leader at the Republic Day Camp Held in New Delhi in 1990. He is the first Indian violinist to perform in United Nations as part of "Breathe life for healthy people-Healthy planet" for first WHO global conference on Air pollution and Health. He has performed with  many famous play back singers like Lucky Ali, Dr. K J Yesudas, K S Chitra and many more.

 Musical style and compositions 
Manoj George is skilled in both Indian Classical and Western music. His original musical compositions merges elements of these different styles and genre.  His music always has an Indian soul, and He introduced contemporary styles on violin, introduced a new genre “Contemporary Indian World Fusion”. He is excellent on different genre’s like World fusion, Indian classical, Classical, Indian blues, Indo jazz, Blues, Indian folk music, Folk music. He experiments on violin’s possibilities with other instruments and comes up with great compositions.

 Philanthropic work 
Apart from being a famous violin player and Music director, Manoj George spends time on charity activities, fund raising programs and he is the patron of the charitable organization (Little flower charitable society) – a movement to improve the quality life of poor.

Manoj has initiated a campaign to recognize independent musicians in India. “He pointed out that the music industry needed a boost. This can be in the form of awards for non-film music, which would be a game-changer. Cinema is the pivot around which majority of musicians revolve. But the fact is that hardly 20 per cent of the musicians, singers included, manage to break into films. The rest of them simply survive without recognition for their talent and hard work.” Manoj wants to change this imbalance, albeit gradually. Internationally the scene is so different. “Michael Jackson, Brian Adams and Shakira became stars through parallel music and not by singing in films. Even in India, there was a time when independent musicians such as Daler Mehndi, Alisha Chinai and Lucky Ali, and their albums were so popular.

Manoj’s mission is to “Change Lives through Music” as well as to make and perform music for those who rarely find their way to concerts, like a performance he had done on Bangalore jail. He recognizes that such performances are very inspiring. The happiness and joy from the audience is a different”.

 Early life 
Manoj George was born in Olarikkara, in Thrissur District of the south Indian state of Kerala. Post his graduation, he moved out to Bangalore to pursue a career as a Music composer, Live performer and a Violinist. Manoj George is a Licentiate (degree) (LTCL) performer in Violin from the Trinity College London.

Manoj first picked up the violin when he was 13. During his childhood days, he always used to get fascinated by a melodious sound coming from his church Choir. Later realized that the beautiful sound was coming from Violin, the eagerness towards that sound always made him sit next to the church choir, violin player and watch the violinist play. The mesmerizing sound haunted him all the time and that got developed into a wish that he should learn that instrument. As a child, he used to sing quite well and participated in all competitions. His father was the first to notice his interests in music and asked him if he is interested to learn any instruments, and that realization reached to Leslie Peter, started learning Violin from his Guru,  Kerala's’s famed tutor Sri. Leslie Peter in Kalasadan, Thrissur.

While he was doing his bachelor's degree, he was awarded scholarship from the Ministry of Human Resources and Culture, Govt. of India, New Delhi. And wanted to pursue this passion seriously and hence moved out from academic studies. This was a very tough decision as it was very unusual, rare and not accepted among the crowd.  Post completion of his graduation at St. Aloysius college in Thrissur, Fr. Thomas Chakkalamattath, director of Chetana Music Academy guided him to Pondicherry for further studies in western classical music. Studied in Pondicherry for 3 years till he completed Licentiate certification (LTCL) under the guidance of Sr. Mary Judith. At the same time, he used to travel to Bangalore, Mumbai, and Chennai for master violin classes from luminaries like Philomena Thumboochetty, Galina Heifetz and Arvind Santwan. Manoj has drawn inspiration from renowned musicians like L Subramanyam, Stephane Grappelli, Jean Luc Ponty, John Mac,  Yanni and the journey of the popular violinist began.

Manoj George resides in Bangalore with his family, spouse Susha Manoj, Neil Manoj and Niya Rose. 

 Career 
After a few years of learning Violin, his teacher offered him to play for concerts, he was truly excited about this offer, since he was still in his 10th grade. He was the youngest in the popular band of Kerala, Thrissur Kalasadan. This gave him an opportunity to perform with legendary singers like KJ Yesudas, KS Chitra, P Jayachandran etc. This also given him an opportunity to play for studio recording sessions, movies and album at a very young age. Post Completing Licentiate of Trinity College London (LTCL)  performer in Violin, Sr. Judith introduced him to Mrs. Sunderlal, Director of Bangalore School of Music, who offered him to teach at Bangalore Music School and as well started performing at the Bangalore Chamber of Orchestra.

After collaborating with multiple bands, he established his own the world fusion band “ManojGeorge 4Strings”, production house “NewWave Productions” and the music school “Manoj George School of Music”.ManojGeorge 4Strings - The world fusion music bandManojGeorge 4Strings is established in 2009, and performs for numerous occasions for corporate events, music festivals, Public events, and College fests. The band’s captivating, high-energy performances transport audiences back in time as it blends musicianship, creativity and tradition. Live music shows are heavily engaging, entertaining, exciting for the audience. The band sprinkles in their own original compositions and other famous compositions that fans of all ages can enjoy. The band has collaborated with several legendary musician’s, chamber orchestra’s from different parts of the world.Manoj George School of MusicThe music school in Bangalore was established in 2009. Manoj George’s passion for music, his interest to share his experience and knowledge to the next generations made him initiate this endeavour. His music academy has three centre’s - Kasavanahalli, and Sarjapur road, Bangalore. Manoj George also finds time in taking music classes in Sarjapur Road center whenever he is in Bangalore.My Journey with Violin'

Manoj George has published his first book "My journey with violin - Violin Method for Beginners" in September 2020 by Lucky Ali. The book is a guide to beginners describing how to play violin and read music in a simple way. This Violin tutorial is available in amazon. Audio/Minus Track of this book is available in Manoj George's YouTube channel "",”

Filmography

References

External links 
 

Indian film score composers
Musicians from Thrissur
Indian violinists
Film musicians from Kerala
Living people
21st-century violinists
Year of birth missing (living people)